Norman Jones (16 June 1932 – 23 April 2013) was an English actor, primarily on television. He appeared in three Doctor Who serials — The Abominable Snowmen (1967, as Khrisong), Doctor Who and the Silurians (1970, as Major Baker) and The Masque of Mandragora (1976, as Hieronymous).

A native of Shropshire, Norman Jones was born at Donnington, son of coal miner Clar (sic) and his wife Florrie Jones. He was educated at Adams' Grammar School, Newport, Shropshire. After taking part in local amateur dramatics in Donnington, employment as a cost clerk at the Lilleshall Company and Sankey's in the area, and work at Birmingham Repertory Theatre, he began his screen career in 1962, the year of his 30th birthday.

Over the following twenty-six years he appeared in numerous episodes of British TV series such as Crossroads (as milkman Ralph Palmer), The Professionals, and The Sweeney, where he was cast as Detective Inspector Perrault in the 1976 episode "Bad Apple". Jones also played another detective, Chief Inspector Bell, in the first series of Inspector Morse, broadcast in 1987.

He also had roles in films, including You Only Live Twice (1967), Oh! What a Lovely War (1969), The Mind of Mr. Soames (1970) and The Abominable Dr. Phibes (1971).

Another notable role for Norman Jones was his performance as Nicholas Higgins in the 1975 TV serial North and South. He also played Ernest Defarge in the 1980 TV adaptation of A Tale of Two Cities.

He also appeared in the title role of The Crooked Man in the Granada Television series The Adventures of Sherlock Holmes. His last appearance was in the 1988 shot-on-video British independent production, The Assassinator (released on DVD as Hitman).

He lived and worked in the United States for a time, as well as in Manchester, Birmingham and London, before settling in Newport, Shropshire. He died, after a heart attack, at the Princess Royal Hospital in Telford on 23 April 2013, aged 80.  He was cremated at Telford Crematorium.

Filmography

References

External links

English male film actors
English male soap opera actors
People educated at Adams' Grammar School
People from Telford
1932 births
2013 deaths
Actors from Shropshire